Berlin Packaging I Bruni Glass is the commercial brand of Berlin Packaging, which provides specialty glass packaging for wine, spirit, food and gourmet markets.

Founded in Milan in 1974 with the name Vetrerie Bruni S.r.l., Bruni Glass is active in the distribution of glass containers for more than 100 countries. Bruni Glass was acquired by Berlin Packaging in 2016.

References

External links

Glassmaking companies of Italy
Manufacturing companies based in Milan